Asier Villalibre Molina (born 30 September 1997) is a Spanish professional footballer who plays as a striker for Deportivo Alavés on loan from Athletic Bilbao.

Club career
Born in Guernica, Biscay, Basque Country, Villalibre joined Athletic Bilbao's youth setup in 2011. He made his debut as a senior with the farm team in the 2013–14 season, scoring on his Tercera División debut at the age of 15.

In May 2015, after a further 20 goals for the third side, Villalibre was promoted to the reserves in the Segunda División – he had already represented them the previous campaign in the Segunda División B. He made his professional debut on 24 August, coming on as a second-half substitute for Gorka Santamaría in a 1–0 home loss against Girona FC.

Villalibre scored his first professional goal for Bilbao Athletic on 6 September 2015, closing the 3–1 home win over RCD Mallorca. At 17 years and 341 days, this made him the second-youngest goalscorer for the team when competing in the second division (behind Ander Garitano's 17 years and 198 days in 1986).

On 3 December 2016, Villalibre was called up to the first team for the Basque derby against SD Eibar, with habitual first-choice Aritz Aduriz suspended after being sent off in the previous league match. He made his La Liga debut the following day, replacing Iñaki Williams after 84 minutes and providing the assist for Iker Muniain to score the final goal of a 3–1 victory in injury time.

Villalibre appeared in his first game in European competition on 8 December 2016, contributing another decisive pass in a 1–1 draw away to SK Rapid Wien in the UEFA Europa League group stage after once again coming on from the bench. He was loaned out to CD Numancia on 2 May of the following year, for one month.

On 20 August 2017, Villalibre was loaned to second-tier club Real Valladolid for one year. After only netting twice in the cup, his loan was terminated and he subsequently moved to Lorca FC of the same league also in a temporary deal.

Villalibre scored his first league goal for Athletic on 25 January 2020, playing 84 minutes in the 1–1 away draw with RCD Espanyol. The following 17 January, his last-minute equaliser against FC Barcelona earned extra time and an eventual 3–2 win in the 2020–21 Supercopa de España Final; he was also the target of an aggression that earned Lionel Messi the first club red card of his career.

After totalling 35 games and four goals in 2020–21, Villalibre fell down the pecking order the following years, and was loaned to Deportivo Alavés on 30 January 2023.

International career
Villalibre made his debut for the unofficial Basque Country national team in May 2019, in a 0–0 draw away to Panama for which a small, youthful and inexperienced squad was selected.

Career statistics

Club

Honours
Athletic Bilbao
Supercopa de España: 2020–21
Copa del Rey runner-up: 2019–20, 2020–21

References

External links

1997 births
Living people
People from Guernica
Sportspeople from Biscay
Spanish footballers
Footballers from the Basque Country (autonomous community)
Association football forwards
La Liga players
Segunda División players
Segunda División B players
Tercera División players
CD Basconia footballers
Bilbao Athletic footballers
Athletic Bilbao footballers
CD Numancia players
Real Valladolid players
Lorca FC players
Deportivo Alavés players
Spain youth international footballers
Basque Country international footballers